Kiss of Death is the eighteenth studio album by British rock band Motörhead, released on 29 August 2006 via Steamhammer, their ninth with the label.

Recording
Kiss of Death was the second album Motörhead recorded with producer Cameron Webb and continues the heavy sound on the band's previous album Inferno. As Joel McIver noted in his 2011 Motörhead memoir Overkill: The Untold Story of Motörhead:

Mike Inez from Alice in Chains and C.C. Deville from Poison also play on the album. "Kingdom of the Worm" received its world premiere on Friday, 19 May, during Lemmy's appearance on the "Jonesy's Jukebox" radio show on Indie 103.1 FM.

Release
Kiss of Death reached No. 4 in Germany, marking Motörhead's highest entry ever in the German charts. The album is also notable for being the final Motörhead album to feature original artwork by longtime artist Joe Petagno.

Critical reception

A review on Drowned in Sound thought Motörhead is not a band that focuses on innovation and progression and that they are happy doing more of the same and their fans are more than happy to receive it, this album being no exception. Otherwise the review notes the tracks are "twelve slices of good old-fashioned, foot-stomping, fist-pumping rock 'n' roll."
Greg Prato of AllMusic praises the band's longevity but feels "there are too many songs that sound like run-of-the-mill modern-day metal (such as 'Living in the Past' and 'Sword of Glory'), rather than the classic Motörhead sound you'd expect." But Lee Marlow of Classic Rock, on 'Sword of Glory", said Lemmy's ability to wring fresh poignancy from the idiocy of war and its mark on history has long been one of Motörhead's sharpest weapons."

Track listing

 Re-recorded with Mikkey Dee on drums

 This limited-edition release was in a tri-fold digipak sleeve, with an artwork poster. The booklet differed slightly from that of the standard release in that there was no brickwork surrounding the central image, just a black border.

Personnel
Credits adapted from the album's liner notes.
 Lemmy – lead vocals, bass
 Phil Campbell – lead guitar
 Mikkey Dee – drums
 C. C. DeVille – guitar solo on "God Was Never on Your Side"
 Mike Inez – additional bass guitar on "Under the Gun"
 Zoltán "Zoli" Téglás – additional backing vocals on "God Was Never on Your Side"

Production 
Cameron Webb – producer, mixing, engineer
 Bob Kulick – producer ("Whiplash")
Bruce Bouillet – producer ("Whiplash")
Sergio Chavez – additional engineering
Kevin Bartley – mastering
Motörhead – executive producers
Lemmy – sketches and handwriting
 Steffan Chirazi – creative direction
Mark Abramson – art direction and design
Robert John – photography
Michael Shreiber – Latin translation
Joe Petagno – album cover, Snaggletooth

Chart positions

References

External links
Motörhead official website

Albums with cover art by Joe Petagno
Motörhead albums
2006 albums
SPV/Steamhammer albums